Bombargo is a pop band from Saskatoon, Saskatchewan that was formed in 2013 by Nathan Thoen and Spencer Chilliak.

History

Thoen and Chilliak were inspired to start a band after attending the Sasquatch Music Festival. In 2015 the duo released their debut EP titled Back on Main which would go on to be included in "The Top 10 Best Saskatchewan Albums of 2015.  Two years later, the band released their first full length album titled We Are Bombargo in May 2017.

In December 2017, Bombargo released their single titled "Mr. No Good" which Taylor Swift added to her Spotify Playlist "Songs Taylor Loves" in February 2018. Bombargo was the only unsigned Canadian artist on the 43 track playlist which featured established international artists including Kendrick Lamar, Camila Cabella and Ed Sheeran.

In August 2018, Bombargo released their single "Oxygen" which went on to peak at No. 41 on the Billboard Canada Hot AC Chart.

Bombargo made their US touring debut in September 2019 as party of their 33-date "North American Dream Tour."

Nebula (2022-present)

During winter in early 2020, Bombargo went to a cabin in Northern Saskatchewan for two weeks.  They set up a studio to record their next album consisting of ten songs.  To help with the release of the album, Bombargo setup a Kickstarter fundraising drive with a goal of $12,000.  With the support of 186 backers, they raised $22,931. The Kickstarter campaign was also to help cover the cost of production, CDs, vinyl, and promotion of the album.  The album went on to be titled Nebula with a scheduled release date of 27 May 2022.  On 28 January 2022, they released the first single "Too Close for Comfort."  They followed that up with the release of their second single "Somedays" on 25 February 2022

Sexual misconduct allegations

On March 22, 2021, a woman accused two members of Bombargo, brothers Nathan Thoen and Nathan's brother Anthony, of engaging in demeaning and predatory behaviour against two other models and her during the production of a promotional video for Team Canada for the 2016 Yukigassen World Championships that was unrelated to the band. Bombargo sued the woman for $782,000, citing defamation. Multiple musicians cancelled their shows at the Coors Event Centre after public backlash when the venue had announced a Bombargo show there in October 2021.

In a February 2022 update, Jackle stated she would continue her legal battle against the lawsuit.  In March, Tiara Jackle retracted her statement about models being underage as she said, "In my original post I noted that one of the models was under 18 at the time of the shoot. At the time of the shoot, I understood she was underage."  She subsequently determined, based on their date of birth, that they were not minors.

Band members 

 Nathan Thoen – Lead vocals
 Spencer Chilliak – Lead guitar, vocals
 Anthony Thoen – Guitar
 Matthew Folkersen – Keyboard, vocals
 Sammy Lee Folkersen – Bass guitar, vocals
 "Rootin' Tootin'" Connor Newton – Saxophone
 Niall Cubbon – Drums

Discography

Albums

Extended plays

Singles

Music videos

References

External links 
 Official site

Canadian indie pop groups
Musical groups from Saskatoon